Helpis is a genus of the spider family Salticidae (jumping spiders).

Species
As of May 2017, the World Spider Catalog lists the following species in the genus:
 Helpis colemani (Wanless, 1988) –  Queensland 
 Helpis foelixi Żabka & Patoleta, 2014 – Queensland 
 Helpis gracilis Gardzinska, 1996 – New South Wales
 Helpis kenilworthi Zabka, 2002 – Queensland, New South Wales
 Helpis longichelis Strand, 1915 – New Guinea
 Helpis longipalpis Gardzinska & Zabka, 2010 – Western Australia
 Helpis merriwa Żabka & Patoleta, 2014 – New South Wales
 Helpis minitabunda (L. Koch, 1880) – New Guinea, Eastern Australia, introduced to New Zealand
 Helpis occidentalis Simon, 1909 – Australia
 Helpis risdonica Zabka, 2002 – Tasmania
 Helpis staregai Żabka & Patoleta, 2014 – New South Wales 
 Helpis tasmanica Zabka, 2002 – Tasmania
 Helpis wanlessi Żabka & Patoleta, 2014 – New South Wales 
 Helpis wisharti Żabka & Patoleta, 2014 – New South Wales

References

External links
 Photograph of H. minitabunda

Salticidae
Spiders of Australia
Spiders of Oceania
Salticidae genera